Hapoel Bnei Arara 'Ara is an Israeli football club based in Ar'ara. The club played in Liga Gimel Jezreel division during the 2015–16 season.

History
The club was founded in 2014 as a new club, following the collapse of former club Hapoel Arara, which folded at the end of the 2011–12 season. The club joined Liga Gimel Jezreel division and placed fourth at the end of its first season. In its second season in Liga Gimel, the club topped its division without losing a match and was promoted to Liga Bet. The club also won the division cup, part of the State Cup competition, beating Hapoel Bnei Musmus 2–1 in the divisional final and qualifying to the national rounds of the competition. The club ended its cup run in the sixth round by, as it was beaten by Liga Alef club Hapoel Herzliya.

Honours

League

Cups

External links
Hapoel Bnei Arara 'Ara  The Israel Football Association 
Facebook Page

References

Arara
Arara
Association football clubs established in 2014
2014 establishments in Israel
Arab-Israeli football clubs